Maharaja Brijendra Singh (born 1 December 1918 – died 8 July 1995) was the last ruler of princely state Bharatpur (1929–1947) and successor of Maharaja Kishan Singh.

Early life
Maharaja Brijendra Singh was born at Savar Mahal, Bharatpur on 1 February 1918. He was the eldest son of Maharaja Kishan Singh by his wife Maharani Rajendra Kaur. He was educated at Bryanston and Wellington.

Ascendancy
Maharaja Brijendra Singh succeeded on the death of his father on 27 March 1929, ascended the throne on 14 April 1929 and reigned under Council of Regency until he came of age. Invested with ruling powers on 22 October 1939. Signed the instrument of accession to the Dominion of India in August 1947. He merged his state into the Matsya Union on 18 March 1948, which was absorbed into state of Rajasthan on 15 May 1949.

Marriage
He first married on 18 June 1941 at the Amba Vilas Palace, Mysore with Maharani Jaya Chamunda Ammani Avaru, who was the third daughter of Yuvaraja Kanteerava Narasimharaja Wadiyar and the sister of Maharaja Jayachamaraja Wodeyar, the last ruling Maharaja of Mysore. Then he did second marriage at Bharatpur in June 1961 (div. 1972) with Maharani Videh Kaur.

As Politician in the independent India
He was a Member of Parliament (Lok Sabha) 1962–1971. He was deprived of his royal rank, titles and honours by the Government of India on 28 December 1971.

Death
He died on 8 July 1995, having had issue Vishvendra Singh.

References 

1918 births
Jat rulers
Rulers of Bharatpur state
1995 deaths
India MPs 1967–1970
Lok Sabha members from Rajasthan
Independent politicians in India
Jat